Rossiinae is a subfamily of bobtail squid encompassing four genera and around twenty species.

Classification
Subfamily Rossiinae
Genus Austrorossia
Austrorossia antillensis, Antilles bobtail squid
Austrorossia australis
Austrorossia bipapillata
Austrorossia enigmatica *
Austrorossia mastigophora
Genus Neorossia
Neorossia caroli, Carol bobtail
Neorossia leptodons
Genus Rossia
Rossia brachyura
Rossia bullisi, Gulf bobtail squid
Rossia glaucopis
Rossia macrosoma, stout bobtail
Rossia megaptera, big-fin bobtail squid
Rossia moelleri
Rossia mollicella
Rossia pacifica
Rossia pacifica diegensis *
Rossia pacifica pacifica, North Pacific bobtail squid
Rossia palpebrosa, warty bobtail squid
Rossia tortugaensis, Tortugas bobtail squid
Genus Semirossia
Semirossia equalis, greater bobtail squid
Semirossia patagonica
Semirossia tenera, lesser bobtail squid

References

External links
CephBase: Rossiinae

Bobtail squid
Taxa named by Adolf Appellöf